This article is an (incomplete) listing of Soviet Ground Forces divisions in 1990, and corresponding information about their later status in 2006. 

The Soviets maintained their units at varying degrees of readiness in peacetime, and divided their ground units into two broad readiness categories:

Развернутая - Ready (expanded, filled up) A unit was considered Ready, if it could conduct combat operations with little or no mobilisation.
Неразвернутая - Not Ready

Some divisions are referred to as 'Reserve' (there is a Russian article for reserve unit at :ru:Запасная часть). The Russian word for reserve (:ru:Запас) literally translates as 'Spare'. The personnel went on the reserve rolls, and for officers and NCOs this means they add 'v zapase' to their rank (e.g. kapitan v zapase). The unit itself changes readiness status from A, to either B (Б), V (В) or G (Г). This means a higher degree of equipment conservation, lower training and operational performance, etc.

The abbreviation BKhVT means Weapons and Equipment Storage Base.

Motor rifle divisions

 65th Motor Rifle Division formed at Kungar, Perm Oblast, June 1957, disbanded January 1959.
 114th Guards Motor Rifle Division - formed 1957, became 32nd Guards MRD 1965.
 122nd Guards Motor Rifle Division - first formed at Dauriya
 126th Motor Rifle Division - first formed at Simferopol
 127th Motor Rifle Division - first formed at Leninakan
 128th Guards Motor Rifle Division - first formed at Mukachevo
 203rd Motor Rifle Division first formed at Karaganda

Mobilisation divisions 

 250th Reserve Motor Rifle division (not listed by Holm)
 279th Reserve Motor Rifle division

Tank divisions
Earlier designations of 1989 units include the 27th Guards Tank Division (79 GTD), 33rd Gds TD (15 GTD), and 35th Gds (41st), 10th (1945-57 designation of 34th Tank Division), 15th (later 78th Tank Division.

Tank divisions later reorganised as motor rifle divisions include the 2nd/32nd/66th, which finally became the 277th Motor Rifle Division, and the 61st/13th, which became the 13th Motor Rifle Division in 1957.

Divisions active 1946-59 include the 1st Guards Tank Division (1945–47), 3rd, and the 111th/16th, redesignated as the 16th in 1955 and disbanded in 1957. Heavy tank divisions active 1957-60 include the 5th, and the 17th (1956–60). Divisions active 1945-47 include the 5th (ex 5th Tank Corps), the 11th Tank Division (Gusev, Kaliningrad Oblast), the 18th (1945–47, Gaysin), and the 19th (Ploesti, Romania, and Odessa).
 

Mobilisation tank divisions included the 69th (Ust-Kamenogorsk), and the 70th-74th Reserve ("Spare") Tank Divisions.

Artillery divisions
2nd Guards Artillery Division, Pushkin, Leningrad Military District, disbanded 1993. Formed on 1 March 1943 from the 4th Artillery Division.
12th Artillery Division, Шелехов/Shelekhov, Transbaikal Military District
15th Guards Artillery Division, Krasnaya Rechka (Khabarovsk), Far East Military District
20th Training Artillery Division, Mulino, Moscow Military District, 468th District Training Center 1987, disbanded 1994
26th Artillery Division, Ternopol, Carpathian Military District (part of 66th Artillery Corps from 1990)
34th Artillery Division, Potsdam, Group of Soviet Forces in Germany (formed 25 June 1945 to July 9, 1945 in Germany)
51st Guards Artillery Division, Osipovichi, Belorussian Military District
55th Artillery Division, Zaporozhia, Odessa Military District
81st Artillery Division, Vinogradov, Carpathian Military District (part of 66th Artillery Corps from 1990)
110th Guards Artillery Division, Buinaksk, North Caucasus Military District
149th Artillery Division, Kaliningrad, Baltic Military District. Traces its history to the 149th Cannon Artillery Neman Red Banner Order of Suvorov, Kutuzov and Alexander Nevsky Brigade. The 149th Cannon Artillery Brigade was formed on May 28, 1944 on the basis of the 403rd Howitzer Artillery Regiment of High Power (:ru:403-й гаубичный артиллерийский полк большой мощности), the 537th cannon artillery regiment and the 827th separate army reconnaissance artillery battalion. The 403rd Howitzer Regiment was separated from the 108th High Power Howitzer Regiment in 1939. It was armed with 24 203mm howitzers. It was part of the frontline army from June 22, 1941 to July 27, 1941 and from October 16, 1941 to April 22, 1944. On June 22, 1941, the 403rd Howitzer Regiment was stationed in Kolomna. With the outbreak of war, another regiment was establsihed at the base of the regiment, the 590th howitzer artillery regiment of high power, and the 403rd regiment was sent to the disposal of the Western Front. The regiment arrived in Orsha, but already on July 12, 1941, returned to Vyazma without materiel. It remains unknown whether the regiment lost guns in Orsha or on the march, or whether the guns were not transported to Orsha. Since the participation of the regiment (one division from its composition) in some kind of military operations jointly with the 102nd Tank Division was planned for mid-July 1941, it is obvious that the regiment had some kind of materiel. But on July 27, 1941, the regiment was withdrawn from the front line to the rear, where it remains until mid-October 1941. Apparently, in the fall of 1941, it was re-armed with 122-mm guns. In the second half of October 1941, the 403rd Howitzer Regiment was transferred to the 43rd Army. After the formation of the 149th Cannon Artillery Brigade, the brigade took part in Operation Bagration in Belarus in 1944, in the East Prussian operation, and the Battle of Königsberg. After the war, reportedly circa 1974, it was reorganised into the 149th Artillery Division in Kaliningrad. Initial reports suggested the division was reduced in status to the 3598th Base for Storage of Weapons and Equipment in the late 1980s; now it appears that the division was actually disbanded in July 1993 and its lineage, honors, and awards transferred to the 26th Rocket Brigade.

Mobilization artillery divisions 
 67th Artillery Division, Malynivka (Chuhuiv),  Kiev Military District, Territorial Training Center 1 December 1987, Equipment Storage Base 1990
 70th Artillery Division, Staryya Darohi, Belorussian Military District
 71st Artillery Division, Zaporizhia, Odessa Military District, Territorial Training Center 1 December 1987, Equipment Storage Base 1989
 72nd Artillery Division, Zhmerynka, Carpathian Military District, Territorial Training Center 1 December 1987, Weapons and Equipment Storage Base 1989
 73rd Artillery Division, Divychky, Kiev Military District, Territorial Training Center 1 December 1987, Equipment Storage Base 1990
 80th Artillery Division, Krupki, Belorussian Military District, became 1533rd Weapons and Equipment Storage Base 1989

Divisions of the airborne forces
 7th Guards Cherkassy Airborne Division (Kaunas, Lithuanian SSR)
 76th Guards Chernigov Airborne Division (Pskov, RSFSR)
 98th Guards Svir Airborne Division (Bolgrad & Kishinev, Moldovan SSR)
 103rd Guards Airborne Division (Vitebsk, Belorussian SSR)
 104th Guards Airborne Division (Kirovabad, Azerbaijan SSR)
 105th Guards Vienna Airborne Division (disbanded 1979)
 106th Guards Tula Airborne Division (Tula, RSFSR)
 242nd District Training Centre of the Airborne Forces (Gaižiūnai/Jonava, Lithuanian SSR) created from the 44th Training Airborne Division, 1987.

Rear divisions 
 228th Rear Division (Mobilization), Moscow, Moscow Military District
 229th Rear Division (Mobilization), Vologda, Leningrad Military District
 230th Rear Division (Mobilization), Dobele, Baltic Military District
 231st Rear Division, Minsk, Belorussian Military District
 232nd Rear Division (Mobilization), Slavuta, Carpathian Military District
 233rd Rear Division (Mobilization), Khmelnytskyi, Carpathian Military District
 234th Rear Division (Mobilization), Tiraspol, Odessa Military District
 235th Rear Division (Mobilization), Artemivsk, Kiev Military District
 238th Rear Division (Mobilization), Kuybyshev, Volga Military District
 239th Rear Division (Mobilization), Volgograd, North Caucasus Military District
 240th Rear Division (Mobilization), Sverdlovsk, Ural Military District

Anti-aircraft artillery divisions 
 61st Anti-Aircraft Artillery Division (Mobilization), Dzigovka, Kiev Military District, Weapons and Equipment Storage Base 1990

Anti-aircraft rocket and artillery divisions 
 61st Anti-Aircraft and Rocket Artillery Division (Mobilization), Dzigovtsy, Carpathian Military District, Weapons and Equipment Storage Base 1989
 119th Anti-Aircraft and Rocket Artillery Division (Mobilization), Zhytomyr, Carpathian Military District, Weapons and Equipment Storage Base 1989
 141st Anti-Aircraft and Rocket Artillery Division (Mobilization), Cherkasy, Kiev Military District, Territorial Training Center 1987, Weapons and Equipment Storage Base 1989
 182nd Anti-Aircraft and Rocket Artillery Division (Mobilization), Kryvyi Rih, Kiev Military District, Territorial Training Center 1987, Weapons and Equipment Storage Base 1989

Divisions disbanded 1945–89
Disbanded 1958(?)← 1957 7th MRD<-7th Mech Div <-1946/55← 7th Mech Corps
343 (55) Rifle Division 1946–55, 136 MRD 1957, disbanded 1958
Disbanded 1958←137 MRD 1957 ←345 (57) RD 1946–55
Disbanded 1959←138 MRD 1957 ←358 (59) RD 1946–55
Disbanded 1960←139 MRD 1957 ←349 (60) RD 1946–55
Disbanded 1959←140 MRD 1957 ←374 (70) RD 1946–55
Disbanded 1958←142 Mtn RD 1957 ←376th Rifle Division (72) RD 1955
Disbanded 1960←143 Gds MRD 1957←72G Mech Div 1946(1955) ←110 GRD
Disbanded 1958 < 144 MRD 1957 < 97th Rifle Division 1946 (1955)

Divisions of the Internal Troops 
Sources:

Notes

References
 V.I. Feskov, K.A. Kalashnikov, V.I. Golikov, The Soviet Army in the Years of the Cold War 1945–91, Tomsk University Publishing House, Tomsk, 2004
Note: this source has significant inaccuracies, as some other information from it has been shown to be incorrect. Alternate information is welcome!
    Improved version of 2004 work with many inaccuracies corrected.

See also
List of Soviet Union divisions 1917–1945
List of Soviet military sites in Germany

External links
http://www.soldat.ru/force/sssr/sp/division/through.html – expanded list of divisions from updated sources (Russian)

Divisions of the Soviet Union
Lists of Russian and Soviet military units and formations
Lists of divisions (military formations)
Structures of military commands and formations in 1989